Sir John Macleod Ball  (born 19 May 1948) is a British mathematician and former Sedleian Professor of Natural Philosophy at the University of Oxford. He was the president of the International Mathematical Union from 2003 to 2006 and a Fellow of Queen's College, Oxford.

Ball was educated at St. John's College, Cambridge and Sussex University, and prior to taking up his Oxford post was a professor of mathematics at Heriot-Watt University in Edinburgh.

Ball's research interests include elasticity, the calculus of variations, and infinite-dimensional dynamical systems.  He was knighted in the New Year Honours list for 2006 "for services to Science". He is a member of the Norwegian Academy of Science and Letters and a fellow of the American Mathematical Society.

He was a member of the first Abel Prize Committee in 2002 and for the Fields Medal Committee in 1998. From 1996 to 1998 he was president of the London Mathematical Society, and from 2003 to 2006 he was president of the International Mathematical Union, IMU. In October 2011, he was elected on the Executive Board of ICSU for a three-year period starting January 2012. Ball is listed as an ISI highly cited researcher.

Along with Stuart S. Antman he won the Theodore von Kármán Prize in 1999. In 2018, he received the King Faisal International Prize in Mathematics.

Ball received an Honorary Doctorate from Heriot-Watt University in 1998.

He was elected a Fellow of The Royal Society of Edinburgh in 1980. He also holds a visiting position at the University of Edinburgh.

Personal life
He is married to Lady Sedhar Chozam-Ball, actress, and has three children.

References

External links
Ball's home page

20th-century British mathematicians
21st-century British mathematicians
Living people
Knights Bachelor
Fellows of the American Mathematical Society
Fellows of the Royal Society
Fellows of the Royal Society of Edinburgh
Fellows of St John's College, Cambridge
Fellows of The Queen's College, Oxford
David Crighton medalists
Alumni of the University of Sussex
Alumni of St John's College, Cambridge
Academics of Heriot-Watt University
Academics of the University of Edinburgh
1948 births
Members of the Norwegian Academy of Science and Letters
Whitehead Prize winners
Sedleian Professors of Natural Philosophy
Sir Edmund Whittaker Memorial Prize winners
Presidents of the International Mathematical Union
Presidents of the Royal Society of Edinburgh